The Loagan Bunut National Park is a national park located in Miri Division, Sarawak, Malaysia, on the Borneo island. The park was named after the  Loagan Bunut lake nearby, which is connected to Sungai Bunut (sungai is Malay for river), Sungai Baram and Sungai Tinjar.

The national park was gazetted on January 1, 1990 and it was opened to public on August 29, 1991.

See also
 List of national parks of Malaysia

References

1990 establishments in Malaysia
Miri Division
National parks of Sarawak
Borneo lowland rain forests
Borneo peat swamp forests